First Presbyterian Church Complex is a historic Presbyterian church located at Gouverneur, St. Lawrence County, New York.  The complex consists of the Romanesque Revival style church (1892-1893) and Queen Anne style manse (1904).  The church has a modified cruciform plan with a cross-gable roof and constructed  of both roughhewn and smoothly dressed Gouverneur marble.  The front facade features an entrance loggia, with unequal square towers with hipped roofs flanking it. The manse is constructed of yellow pressed brick and features a round three-story tower and verandah. The interior features Colonial Revival style design elements.  The house was sold to the Gouverneur Historical Society in 1974 and houses a local history museum

It was listed on the National Register of Historic Places in 2015.

References

External links
church website
Gouverneur Museum website

History museums in New York (state)
Presbyterian churches in New York (state)
Churches on the National Register of Historic Places in New York (state)
Romanesque Revival architecture in New York (state)
Queen Anne architecture in New York (state)
Colonial Revival architecture in New York (state)
Churches completed in 1893
Houses completed in 1904
Churches in St. Lawrence County, New York
National Register of Historic Places in St. Lawrence County, New York